A voiturette is a miniature automobile.

History
Voiturette was first registered by Léon Bollée in 1895 to name his new motor tricycle. The term became so popular in the early years of the motor industry that it was used by many makers to describe their small cars. The word comes from the French word for "automobile", voiture.
Between World War I and World War II light-weight racing cars with engines limited to 1500 cc such as the Alfa Romeo 158/159 Alfetta, the Bugatti Type 13 and the original ERAs were known as voiturettes.

In France, in the years after World War II a type of small three-wheeled vehicle voiturette was produced.

In 1990s, voiturette became a French classification for a vehicle weighing less than 350 kilograms (770 lb) empty and carrying a load (i.e. passengers) of not more than 200 kilograms (~440 lb). The top speed is limited to 45 km/h (~30 mph) and engine size to 50 cc or 4 kilowatts for an engine of "another type" for example an electric car.
 Such vehicles are sometimes also called "motor quadricycles" or "motor tricycles". The driver's license for them is available to people over 16 years and is in category "B1" and is valid, subject to restrictions, in all European Union countries.

Renault's 1898 Voiturette

French maker Renault's first car was simply called Voiturette, instead of the common usage then (it would have been called Renault 1¾ CV). The 1900 model (Voiturette C) was considered the first ever sedan (a car with roof).

Other automobiles so described
Dalifol, manufactured in 1896 in France
Dalifol & Thomas, manufactured from 1896 until 1898 in France
Populaire, manufactured only in 1899 in France
Esculapeus, manufactured in 1902 in England
Damaizin & Pujos, manufactured in 1910 in France
David & Bourgeois, manufactured in 1898 in France
De Boisse, manufactured from 1901 until 1904 in France
De Riancey, manufactured from 1898 until around 1901 in France
Guerraz, manufactured in 1901 in France
Guerry et Bourguignon, built in 1907 in France

See also
Microcar
Low-speed vehicle

External links
  Description of Light Vehicles

Veteran vehicles